Vancouver Institute of Media Arts (VanArts) is a private post-secondary school located in Vancouver, British Columbia, Canada which was founded in 1995. VanArts offers one-year diploma programs for the visual, media and performing arts plus degree pathways with university partners.

VanArts is designated through the Private Training Institutions Branch (PTIB).

History
VanArts was founded in 1995 with Lee Mishkin as its founding program director.

The first campus for VanArts was on West Broadway in Vancouver, and by January 1997 it had moved downtown to 837 Beatty Street.  Originally offering programs for Classical Animation, then computer animation in 1998, the school expanded to offer Game Art & Design in 2003 and Visual Effects in 2004.  Upon adding the first Digital Photography program in North America in 2006, VanArts needed to expand and moved to a new campus at 626 West Pender Street.  In 2008, the William Davis Centre for Actors Study joined up with VanArts and became its Acting department.  Another move happened in July 2010 to its current location at 570 Dunsmuir Street.  2011 brought new departments for Web Development & Interactive Design, and the addition of Broadcasting and Online Media. In 2021 the school moved to a custom made floor at 333 Terminal Avenue.

The William Davis Centre for Actors Study
The William Davis Centre for Actors Study was opened in 1989 by William B. Davis. In 2008 the William Davis Centre for Actors Study became the acting department of VanArts.

Notable faculty

 Chilton Crane, Head of Acting department – credits include Supernatural, The X-Files, Once Upon a Time.

Notable alumni

Jordan Armstrong (News Anchor/Reporter, Global BC)
Braeden Clarke (Actor, Outlander)
Georgie Daburas (Actor, Chilling Adventures of Sabrina)
Aaron Douglas (Actor, [[Battlestar Galactica (2004 TV series)|Battlestar Galactica)]]
Galen Fott (Director/Animator, I Want My Hat Back)
Lucy Lawless (Actor, Xena: Warrior Princess, Ash vs. Evil Dead)
Steven Cree Molison (Actor, Blackstone)
Eden Muñoz (VFX Supervisor/Studio Owner, Pixel Perfect)
Porus Vimadal (Elle India Graduates 2016 - Photography of the Year)
Paul Zeke (Visual Effects, Winner VES Award 2019 for Outstanding Animated Character in an Episode or Real-Time Project, Lost in Space)

Programs
VanArts offers 7 full-time 12 month programs:
ACTING FOR FILM & TELEVISION
ANIMATION (2D & 3D tracks)
GAME ART & DESIGN
PROFESSIONAL PHOTOGRAPHY
VISUAL EFFECTS FOR FILM & TV
WEB DEVELOPMENT & INTERACTIVE DESIGN

Partnerships
2011 marked VanArts’ first degree pathway agreement with Woodbury University in Burbank, CA, soon to be followed by further pathways with Deakin University in Melbourne, Australia, Bond University and Griffith University in Queensland, Australia, Media Design School in Auckland, New Zealand, University of Gloucestershire in the United Kingdom.  In 2013, VanArts signed an agreement for its first local degree pathway with the Vancouver campus of Fairleigh Dickinson University.

Local partners
British Columbia Institute of Technology (BCIT)
Emily Carr University of Art and Design
Fairleigh Dickinson University
University of the Fraser Valley

References

External links
 

Art schools in Canada
Universities and colleges in Vancouver
Drama schools in Canada
Educational institutions established in 1995
Education in Vancouver
1995 establishments in British Columbia